Edgware Road is the name of two London Underground stations near the junction of Edgware Road and Marylebone Road in Central London:

 Edgware Road tube station (Bakerloo line)
 Edgware Road tube station (Circle, District and Hammersmith & City lines), location of the 2005 London bombings

See also
 Edgware tube station

Disambig-Class London Transport articles